John Barter Bennett (c.1824 – 19 May 1887) was a lawyer and politician in colonial Victoria, a member of the Victorian Legislative Council.

Early life
Bennett was born in Cork, Ireland.

Colonial Australia
Bennett arrived in the Melbourne in 1842 and was admitted attorney to the Supreme Court of New South Wales for the Port Phillip District. Bennett represented the Southern Province in the inaugural Victorian Legislative Council from November 1856 to May 1863. 
Bennett was senior partner in the firm of Messrs. Bennett, Attenborough, Wilks, & Nunn, solicitors and notaries public, Collins Street, Melbourne.

Bennett later lived at 28 Stanhope Gardens, South Kensington, England, and died in London on 19 May 1887. He was married to Kate and had two daughters; he left his estate of £43,000 to his family.

References

 

1824 births
1859 deaths
Members of the Victorian Legislative Council
People from County Cork
19th-century Australian lawyers
Irish emigrants to colonial Australia
19th-century Australian politicians